Rhododendron pseudochrysanthum, the false-gold-flower rhododendron, is a species of flowering plant in the heath family Ericaceae, native to Taiwan. In spring, trusses of pink buds appear, opening to pale pink flowers spotted with deeper pink on the inner surface.

In cultivation in the UK Rhododendron pseudochrysanthum has gained the Royal Horticultural Society’s Award of Garden Merit. It is hardy down to  but like most rhododendrons it requires a sheltered spot in dappled shade, and an acid soil enriched with leaf mould.

Synonyms
Rhododendron nankotaisanense Hayata
Rhododendron pseudochrysanthum var. nankotaisanense (Hayata) T. Yamazaki

References

pseudochrysanthum